Two ships of the Royal Navy have been named HMS Auckland:

  was a Bombay frigate launched in 1840

Royal Navy ship names